Fairburn Tower is a recently restored Scottish castle near Inverness and Muir of Ord in the parish of Urray.

The tower house on a hill above the River Orrin is believed to have been built in 1545 for Murdo Mackenzie.

Mackenzie of Fairburn
Murdo Mackenzie (died 1590) was a son of Roderick (Rory) Mackenzie, and probably a nephew of John Mackenzie of Kintail. Rory Mackenzie, a nephew of Thomas Fraser, 2nd Lord Lovat, who died in 1533, owned nearby farms or townships at Comrie, Scatnell, and "Acheleis", and the mill at Contin. His mother is said to have been a daughter of Duncan McWilliam Dow vic Leod.

Murdo Mackenzie became a courtier, a groom or valet of the bedchamber for James V of Scotland from 1538. It is said that Murdo was sent to join the royal household after his father impressed the king in a wrestling match.

Murdo Mackenzie is recorded as a companion of the king in 1540 at Stirling Castle, Falkland Palace, and Dudhope Castle. On 30 April 1540 the king's pursemaster John Tennent gave him 22 shillings to buy gunpowder in Dundee for the king's handguns. Mackenzie, and three other grooms of the chamber, Alexander Kemp, Sandy Whitelaw, and Andrew Drummond, were given money for livery clothes in 1540, and their clothing allowance was increased. In June 1542 Mackenzie was given a gift of "composition" worth £113.

Fairburn and its lands
Murdo Mackenzie was granted the lands of Fairburn and other farms on 1 April 1542, and for the hearth of each homestead he was to pay the feudal duty of a hen, called a "reik hen." He was instructed to build a new house with orchards and a garden. After he married Mariobelle or Margaret Urquhart, in 1549 Mary, Queen of Scots gave him more land in the parish. A translation of Mackenzie's charter is given in the Origines Parochiales. Murdo Mackenzie died on 20 December 1590 and wished to be buried with his forebears in Beauly Priory.

The original entrance was on the first floor, with an internal stair providing the only access to the vaulted ground floor chamber. A wing with a stair was added to the older tower in the 17th-century, providing a gound-floor entrance to the tower. There are shot-holes or gun-loops at ground-floor level and bartizans or turrets on wall heads.

The adjacent lands of "Wester Fairburn" were given to Andrew Keith, Lord Dingwall in March 1584.

The tower and the Mackenzie family were mentioned in the prophecies of the Brahan Seer, predicting the end of the family and the ruin of the building, and the apparition of a cow upstairs. The seer, Kenneth Ower or Coinneach Odhar, was executed for witchcraft at the Chanonry of Ross in 1578.

Abandonment and Restoration

The tower was abandoned around the year 1780 and the roof, which was made with oak shingles, blew down in a gale in 1803. Hugh Miller, who heard stories of the Mackenzies from a woman called Isobel, known as "Mad Bell", described the ruin as a "ghastly spectre of the past".

Fairburn Tower is Category A listed by Historic Environment Scotland. It has been restored by the Landmark Trust, and is now available for holiday rental.

References

External links

 'Fairburn Tower', Canmore database, HES/RCAHMS
 Landmark Trust appeal to restore Fairburn Tower

Ruined castles in Highland (council area)
Tower houses in Scotland
Category A listed buildings in Highland (council area)
Clan Mackenzie
Landmark Trust properties in Scotland